Kiasi is a Hokkien phrase, literally means afraid of death,  to describe the attitude of being overly afraid or timid. Kiasi is commonly compared to Kiasu (literally: “fear of losing”); both are commonly used to describe attitudes where Kiasi or Kiasi-ism means to take extreme measures to avoid risk and Kiasu or Kiasu-ism means to take extreme means to achieve success. Kiasi is not as popular as kiasu, but is widely used by Hokkien-speaking people in Singapore, Malaysia and Taiwan.

Etymology and usage
The history of kiasi can be traced back to the Chinese idiom "Greedy for life, afraid of death", which describes a person's extreme fear of death, and may drive a person to lose his sense of justice and righteousness. The idiom was originally applied to cowardly soldiers on the battlefield. In modern usage, it refers to people who are irrationally frightful to undertake any task.

In popular culture
 Kiasu, Kiasi : You Think What? (Paperback, 160 pages) by David Leo.

See also
 Kiasu
 Strawberry generation

External links
 Definition from www.talkingcock.com
 see: kiasi from A Dictionary of Singlish and Singaporean English 

Singaporean culture
Malaysian culture
Southern Min words and phrases
Singlish